Mawlid Hayir—more fully, in Somali, Mudane Mawliid Haayir Xassan, meaning the Honorable Mawlid Hayir Hassan—is the regional vice-president of one of the nine divisions (kililoch) of Ethiopia: the Somali regional state. He is a member of the Somali regional parliament, serving it as a member of the ruling Ethiopian Somali People Democratic Party (ESPDP). He is also the head of the BOE and the co-chair of the RNCB. He hails from the Makayl-Dheere clan of the Gadabuursi.

References

Year of birth missing (living people)
Living people
Ethiopian politicians
Gadabuursi